Huddersfield Town's 1960–61 campaign was Town's worst ever season to date. They missed out on relegation to Division Three for the first time in their history. They finished the season in 20th place, just two points ahead of relegated Portsmouth. Their main high point of the season was the defeat of FA Cup holders Wolverhampton Wanderers in the third round of the FA Cup.

Squad at the start of the season

Review
Following Denis Law's record-breaking departure to Manchester City the previous season, Town's strikeforce was severely depleted, despite the purchase of Derek Stokes from neighbours Bradford City. Town's start was OK in the strike department, but the defence department was leaking goals leading Town down the table to the relegation trapdoor to Division Three. Not even a 4–1 win over rivals Leeds United at Elland Road gave Town much joy during the season. As Town were dropping rapidly down the table Aston Villa's Pat Saward was brought in to stop the slide. Les Massie & Derek Stokes' 31 league goals helped Town survive the drop by just two points from Portsmouth. They finished 20th with just 35 points, their closest shave with relegation in their history.

Their season will be best remembered for their exploits in the FA Cup. Their 3rd round match was against the holders and Division One leaders Wolverhampton Wanderers. At the time, Town were bottom of Division Two and travelled to Molineux Stadium with virtually no chance of victory expected. They managed a 1–1 draw thanks to a goal by Stokes. The replay at Leeds Road was the first match to use the newly erected "Denis Law Lights" and saw Town victorious by the score of 2–1 with goals from Stokes and Michael O'Grady. They eventually lost to Barnsley in the next round.

Squad at the end of the season

Results

Division Two

FA Cup

Football League Cup

Appearances and goals

1960-61
English football clubs 1960–61 season